Thomas Carrol Jefferson, OBE (April 13, 1941 – October 29, 2006) was a Caymanian politician. He was the first Leader of Government Business in the Cayman Islands, serving from 1992 to 1995.

Jefferson whose public positions included Minister, the first Elected Member to be Leader of Government Business, ExCo Member, MLA (West Bay) and Financial Secretary of the Cayman Islands.

Jefferson received a Master of Arts degree from Vanderbilt University in 1975.

References

1941 births
2006 deaths
Leaders of Government Business of the Cayman Islands
People from Grand Cayman
Vanderbilt University alumni